Erin Dagon-Mitchell (born September 28, 1965) is an actress, director, and playwright from Anchorage, Alaska.

She was born in Princeton, New Jersey before moving to Anchorage in 1976.

Awards and nominations

After graduating magna cum laude with a Masters in Theatre and Communications from Wichita State University (WSU), she lectured for the Department of Theatre at WSU as well as acted, directed and taught around the country for the Wichita Children's Theatre, Wichita Summer Rep, Bend Theatre for Young People, Kokopelli Productions, and the University of Alaska Anchorage.

As a director Mitchell won international acclaim when her production of Soapy Smith's Alaskana Extravaganza was chosen as an American  representative to The Olympic Arts Festival in Sydney, Australia in 2000. She made her New York City debut directing Grand Central and 42nd by Arlitia Jones and The Resurrection of Humpty Dumpty by P. Shane Mitchell for The Samuel French Short Play Festival.

In 2002 she was a recipient of the Patricia Neal Acting Award from the Last Frontier Theatre Conference.

Directing credits

Mrs. Mitchell has directed over 40 plays including critically acclaimed productions of  Into The Woods, Blithe Spirit, Dracula, Bat Boy: The Musical,  Cotton Patch Gospel, The Big Slam, Much Ado About Nothing, and Between Daylight and Boonville. Her production of Should Old Acquaintance was selected as a special performance for the Kansas City American College Theater Festival.

Acting credits

As an actress she has performed the works of Edward Albee, Tony Kushner and John Guare for those Pulitzer Prize winning playwrights. Favored roles include Kate Keller in  The Miracle Worker, Nora Flood in The Dark at the Top of the Stairs, Titania and Puck in A Midsummer Night's Dream, Frenchy in Grease and the title role in The Witch of Greythorn.

In May 2008, Dagon debuted the role of the evil witch in a newly penned musical version of Hansel and Gretel, a collaboration between her husband and Anchorage composer/lyricist Dennis Cleary.

Playwriting credits

As a playwright her collaborative work Jolly Roger; King of the Pirates was published by Pioneer Drama Services and her short work Theodore Goodman'' was produced in the 2nd annual Don't Blink play festival.

Mrs. Mitchell is one of the founding directors of TBA Theatre Company in Anchorage, Alaska.

References

External links
 Pioneer Drama Service
 Public Facebook page

1965 births
Actresses from Anchorage, Alaska
20th-century American dramatists and playwrights
American stage actresses
American theatre directors
Women theatre directors
Living people
People from Princeton, New Jersey
University of Alaska Anchorage faculty
Wichita State University alumni
Wichita State University faculty
20th-century American actresses
American women academics
21st-century American women